Luther Manship (April 16, 1853 - April 22, 1915) was an American politician. He served as the Lieutenant-Governor of Mississippi under Governor Edmond Noel.

Biography
Luther Manship was born in Jackson, Mississippi. He married Mary Belmont Phelps in 1881.

He was elected to the Mississippi House of Representatives in 1896. He served as the state's lieutenant governor under Edmond Noel from 1908 to 1912.

He died at his home in Jackson on April 22, 1915, and was buried in Greenwood Cemetery.

References

1853 births
1915 deaths
Lieutenant Governors of Mississippi
Members of the Mississippi House of Representatives